What You Got may refer to:

 "What You Got" (Abs song), 2002
 "What You Got" (Colby O'Donis song), 2008
 "What You Got" (Grinspoon song), 2007
 "What You Got" (John Lennon song), 1974
 "What You Got", a song by Reveille from Bleed the Sky, 2001

See also
 What Cha Got, an album by Al Kapone, 1997
 "Whatchugot", a song by Caro Emerald from Emerald Island, 2017